The Karabinek wz.29 (Kbk wz.29; Polish: carbine model 29) was a Polish bolt-action short rifle based on the German Kar98AZ. Identifying attributes include a 98/05 style mast bayonet lug ending directly beneath the front sight and winged protective ears to either side of the front sight blade. Cavalry models featured a turned-down bolt handle, and early versions had a stacking hook near the end of the stock on the right side.

Design history 

After regaining independence in 1918, the Polish Army was armed with weapons left over from the nations that occupied Poland during the Partition Era, including Russian M91 Mosin–Nagants, Austrian Steyr-Mannlichers, and German Gewehr 98s. French Berthiers and Lebels from the soldiers of the Blue Army were also on hand, as well as the Japanese Arisaka and guns from Great Britain such as the Lee–Enfield.

As a result, at the end of Polish-Soviet War in 1921, the Polish army was armed with approximately 24 types of guns and 22 rifles firing different ammunition. In an effort to reduce logistical difficulties, the Polish Army sought to adopt a single type of rifle. Conveniently, the Treaty of Versailles, having established the Free City of Danzig, gave the Polish Army access to the weapons-making facilities at the Danzig Arsenal, facilitating the choice of the Mauser 98 action as the basis for any new Polish military rifle. The Mauser was also arguably one of the best bolt-action rifles at the time and the best available to Poland. Production of the wz.98 began in July 1922, after the Danzig machinery was moved to Warsaw and creating the National Rifle Factory in Radom.

Two years later, production of the wz.98 rifles was stopped. The military sought to adopt an intermediate-length rifle, such as the Lee–Enfield, M1903 Springfield, or the German Karabiner 98a based on analyses of combat experience in World War I and the Polish-Soviet War.

Field use of the K98a rifles showed that the design was not fit for use as an infantry weapon  (originally, the K98a had been developed as a weapon for auxiliary or special troops). The greatest flaw was the weak bayonet mount, as the bayonet lug would break off when hitting hard objects. The K98a also used a small-ring Mauser action, which complicated the production process. Following the postwar shift to large-ring carbines with 600 mm barrels and Gewehr 98-style bayonet lug/muzzle lengths, such as the Czech vz. 24, the decision was made to develop an intermediate model rifle for the Polish Army. The design was finalized in 1929. The new wz.29 rifle was based on the old wz.98 rifle, but with a shortened stock and barrel, stronger alloys for the receiver and barrel, a reinforced chamber, and increased dimensional tolerance in the action, allowing for easy interchangeability of parts. There were two versions of the rifle: Infantry models had straight bolt handles, while cavalry models had curved handles. Since both variations used the same stock, cavalry models had a cutout in the stock for the curved handle.

Production of the new weapons began in 1930 at the National Arms Factory in Radom. Despite the production of wz. 98a long rifles beginning in 1936, wz.29 production continued until September 1939, with a total of approximately 264,000 rifles produced, including rifles produced for export to Spain and Afghanistan.

During the September Campaign, wz.29 rifles were used by the Polish Army in the defense of Poland, against German troops using the similar Karabiner 98k. After the defeat of Poland, they were used by the guerrillas of the Polish Underground. Captured wz.29 rifles were also used by the Wehrmacht as the Gewehr 298 (p).

Technical overview 
Carbine wz.29 was a bolt-action rifle, with typical Mauser-action lock, with two large main lugs at the bolt head and a third safety lug at the rear. Ammunition was fed from a fixed two-row box magazine holding five rounds. A three-position safety catch was attached at the rear of the bolt, securing the firing pin. The sights consisted of an open post-type front sight, and a tangent-type rear sight with a V-shaped rear notch; the rear sight was a rear tangent sight that was graduated from 100 to 2000 meters at 100-meter intervals. The weapon was equipped with a knife-type bayonet wz.29.

Gewehr 29/40 
This model was a clone of the Karabiner 98k built at the Radom factory for Germany.  The Austrian firm Steyr was given control of the factory and they produced rifles for the Kriegsmarine and Luftwaffe.  The name is a mixture of the German word for rifle gewehr, the last two digits of the Polish model number 29, and the last two digits of the year it was placed in production for the Germans 40.  These rifles can be identified by the stamp G 29/40 on their receiver.  This model is also sometimes given the Fremdgerät country designation(ö) for österreichisch or Austria.  The resulting designation would be Gewehr 29/40(ö).

Users 

 : 100
 : Some captured in 1939, rest produced under Occupation of Poland
 : 1,697
 : 12,450
 : 13,000
 : Around 250,000, standard-issue rifle during the 1930s
 : Some captured in 1939
 : 95,894, while many had Polish markings absent, there were documented examples of ones which retained them
 : Captured from Republicans
Around 10,561 were exported to unknown customers, probably either the Spanish Republic or the Spanish State.

References

 Zbigniew Nail, Piotr Zarzycki, the Polish construction arms, SIGMA NOT 1993. 
 Roman Matuszewski, Ireneusz J. Wojciechowski, TBiU no. 91 Mauser rifle wz. 1898, WMON 1983. 
 Instruction on infantry weapons, carbine Polish wz. 29, Publisher of Military Bookshop Min Spr. Prov 1928

Bolt-action rifles of Poland
World War II infantry weapons of Poland
Science and technology in Poland
7.92×57mm Mauser rifles
Mauser rifles
Military equipment introduced in the 1930s